Ram Surat Kumar Yadav is an Indian politician. He is a member of the Bharatiya Janata Party from Bihar. He was elected as a member of the 2020 Bihar Legislative Assembly election from Aurai (Vidhan Sabha constituency).

References

Living people
People from Muzaffarpur district
1972 births
Bharatiya Janata Party politicians from Bihar